A shock mount or isolation mount is a mechanical fastener that connects two parts elastically. They are used for shock and vibration isolation.

Isolation mounts allow a piece of equipment to be securely mounted to a foundation and/or frame and, at the same time, allow it to float independently from the substrate.

Uses 

Shock mounts can be found in a wide variety of applications.

Shock mounts can be used to isolate the foundation or substrate  from the dynamics of the mounted equipment. This is vital on submarines where  silence is critical to mission success. Yachts also use shock mounts to dampen the noise (mainly the one transmitted throughout the structure) and increase the comfort. This is usually done through elastic supports and transmission couplings.

Another common example of this are the motor and transmission mounts that are used in virtually every automobile manufactured today. Without isolation mounts, the interior noise and comfort level in today's vehicles would be significantly different than what we have grown accustomed to. In this case, shock and vibration isolation mounts are often chosen by the nature of the dynamics produced by the equipment and the weight of the equipment.

Shock mounts can be used to isolate sensitive equipment from undesirable dynamics of the foundation or substrate. Sensitive laboratory equipment needs to be isolated from handling shocks and ambient vibration.  Military equipment and ships need to be able to withstand nearby explosions.  Shock mounts are found in some disc drives and compact disc players, in which soft bushings are all that mechanically hold the disk and reading assembly, thereby isolating it from outside vibrations and from other outside loads such as torsion. In this case, isolation mounts are often chosen by the sensitivity of the equipment to shock (fragility) and vibration (natural frequency) and the weight of the equipment. This and nature of  the input shock and vibration must be matched. A shock pulse is characterised by its peak acceleration, the duration, and the shape of the shock pulse (half sine, triangular, trapezoidal, etc.). The shock response spectrum is a method for further evaluating a mechanical shock.

Shock mounts are used to isolate entire buildings from the movement of the ground in earthquakes, called base isolators.

A similar idea, also known as a shock mount, is found in furniture design, introduced by Charles and Ray Eames. This provides some shock absorption and serves as a living hinge, allowing the seat back to pivot.

Shock mounts are also sometimes used in bicycle saddles, or their handlebars.

Design 

Maxwell and Kelvin–Voigt models of viscoelasticity use springs and dashpots in series and parallel circuits respectively. Hydraulic and pneumatic components can be included, depending on the use.

Laminated pads 
One  common type of isolation mounts is laminated pads. Generally, these pads consist of a cork or polymeric foam core which has been laminated between two pieces of ribbed neoprene sheet.

Molded rubber isolation mounts 
Molded rubber isolation mounts are typically manufactured for specific applications. The best example of this is automotive engine and transmission mounts. Rubber bushings compress synthetic rubber rings on bolts to provide some isolation – operating temperature is sometimes a factor.  Other  shock mounts have mechanical springs or an elastomer (in tension or compression) engineered to isolate an item from specified mechanical shock and vibration. Some form of dashpot is usually used with a spring  to provide viscous damping. Viscoelastic materials are common. Temperature is a factor in the dynamic response of rubber.  Generally, a molded rubber mount is best suited for heavy loads producing higher frequency vibrations.

Cable isolation mounts 
Cable mounts are based around a coil of wire rope fixed to an upper and lower mounting bar.  When properly matched to the load, these mounts provide isolation over a broad frequency range. They are typically applied to high performance applications, such as mounting sensitive instrumentation into off-road vehicles and shipboard.

Coil spring isolation mounts 

Coil spring isolation mounts generally provide the greatest degree of movement and the best low frequency performance. They are particularly popular for mounting equipment in buildings such as air handlers, filtration units, air conditioning and refrigeration systems and large pipes. Their degree of movement makes them ideal for applications where high flexure and/or expansion and contraction are a consideration.

Microphone mounts 

Shock mounts for microphones can provide basic protection from damage, but their prime use is to isolate microphones from mechanically transmitted noise. This can originate as floor vibrations transmitted through a floor stand, or as "finger" and other handling noise on boom poles. All microphones behave to some extent as accelerometers, with the most sensitive axis being perpendicular to the diaphragm. Additionally, some microphones contain internal elements such as vacuum tubes and  transformers which can be inherently microphonic. These are often cushioned by resilient internal methods, in addition to the employment of external isolation mounts.

Early microphones used a 'ring and spring' mount, where a single rigid ring was mounted and carried the microphone between a number of coil springs, usually four or eight. When early microphones were heavy and omnidirectional, this was adequate. However the single plane of suspension allowed the microphone to twist very easily; once microphones started to become directional, this twisting caused fading of the signal. A more three-dimensional and less planar suspension would be required.

Large side-address studio microphone are generally strung in "cat's cradle" mounts, using fabric-wound rubber elastic elements to provide isolation. While the elastic elements can deteriorate and sag over time, the low price of the mount and ease of replacing the elastic elements mean they remain a mainstay despite introduction of elastomer-based designs less sensible to degradation over time.

The same occurs for end-fire microphones, most often employed for location work, however positioning consistency issues in mobile contexts means elastomer-based alternatives have made more inroads: they offer more displacement (positional flexibility) along the prime axis but, but better restrict movement along other axis, and have less tendency to keep oscillating after movements, which provide for better control of the microphone's precise position.

See also 
Bushing
Vibration isolation
Shock absorber
MIL-S-901
Microphonics
Cushioning

References

 DeSilva, C. W., "Vibration and Shock Handbook", CRC, 2005, 
 Harris, C. M., and Peirsol, A. G. "Shock and Vibration Handbook", 2001, McGraw Hill,

External links

Shock and vibration testing of shock mounts 

Microphones
Mechanical vibrations
Fasteners